Jeong Jun-ha (born March 18, 1971) is a South Korean comedian and entertainer. His well-known motto is "(Whether they) give love or not, (he) always gives love: Jeong Jun-ha" (정주나 안정주나 늘정주는 정준하).

History
Just after graduating Gangseo Senior High school, he entered directly into the Korean entertainment industry, as an official manager of comedian Lee Hwi-jae. His television debut was on the programme "Theme Theatre" of the MBC in 1995, as a cameo of several episodes.

After coping with a depression of his career, he appeared in a segment of the brand-new comedy programme "Comedy House - No-brain Survival"(MBC, 2003~2005). This segment was a parody of segment "Brain Survivor" from Sunday Sunday Night, and his role was a foolish quiz-challenger, including the creation of fad words such as "This is like, killing me twice" (이건 나를 두 번 죽이는 거예요)

In his later career, he has become a top Korean comedian. He has appeared in a wide range of programmes in the entertainment industry. During the winter season of 2006-2007, he was a cast member of The Full Monty (as Dave). He has also taken part in several Korean sitcoms and movies, including the top-rated High Kick! (as Lee Jun-ha) and the movie Marrying the Mafia II (as Jong-myeon). He is a captain of the Korean entertainer baseball team "Han" (Hangul: 한 恨, meaning "Incumbent").

Infinite Challenge

Characters
With the huge success of "No-brain Survival", he eventually become an official member of top-rating comic variety program Infinite Challenge since March 2006 and as the second eldest member, he is positioned as "the third-in-command" (3인자), putting him below the host-in-chief Yoo Jae-suk and fellow co-host Park Myung-soo. Soon, he re-created his character as "Super-Fatty" (뚱뚱보), in contrast with the former "Fatty" (뚱보) and his long-time colleague on this programme, Jeong Hyeong-don.

On Infinite Challenge, he is noticeable for three things: his tall and big stature, his extraordinary appetite, and his degree of slowness in judgment.

One of the program's running gags is his stature, both verbally and physically. He is nicknamed "Daegari" (대가리), the vernacular word for "head", and "the Helmet" (헬멧), due to the extraordinary size (roughly 8 kg) of his head. Despite being the strongest member, which is displayed on some occasions, Jun-ha's timidness makes him an easy target for the other members, especially the ones who younger than him, to use his body for gags. Another nickname for him is "Mount Jun-ha" (준하산), since the member who stands behind him would probably be blocked and unable to hear what Yoo Jae-suk says. The other members thus considered the most-left position of the arrangement as the unluckiest one, since Jun-ha stood between that position and Yoo Jae-suk. Hyung-don joked that "his rights to sunlight were violated" by Jun-ha after staying in that position for about three years until Haha temporarily left the program to fulfill his military service and Jun Jin's addition to the team resulted in a change of arrangement in 2008.

He is highly acclaimed not only by the fellow cast members, but also by other Korean celebrities, for his extraordinary appetite which gained him the nickname the "God of Eating" (식신/食神 Shikshin). Before becoming an official member, he participated on the episode of Season 1 (S01E21) as a guest challenger. During that episode, he ate a bowl of hot Garak-guksu within 12 seconds. He earned respect from his challengers. During the 50th episode of season 4, his mission to eat 50 small dishes of Garak-guksu (within 300 seconds) was accomplished. Outside the program, he participated in a hot dog eating competition at Saipan’s International Food Festival for his own program, Y-Star's God of Eating's Road, and took third place in 2013.

His other famous nickname is the "Stupid (Older) Brother" (바보형) or "Not-so-responsive (Older) Brother" (눈치없는 형). The nickname was given because he was famous for his foolish character in "No-Brain Survival" and because of his tactlessness and cluelessness. He often brings the mood down through corny jokes and by pretending to be cute. He has the highest IQ among the cast, as revealed in an episode aired on February 28, 2009 (S04E143). He has an aptitude for working with numbers and calculating sums quickly and correctly, gaining him another nickname in direct contrast with his foolish charisma, "Secretary Jung" (정총무).

He is also known for arguing and quarreling over petty issues with co-host Park Myeong-su. The unique relationship between Jun-ha and Myung-soo have spawned an occasional segment called "Ha & Soo". "Ha & Soo" is also known as "Peter & Jonathan" with Myung-soo as "Peter" and Jun-ha as "Jonathan". Another similar nickname is "Black Pepper" (후춧가루), given to him after he joked about both him and Myeong-su just being seasoning ("red pepper and black pepper") for Yoo Jae-suk who is the centre of the program ("main menu") during  Infinite Challenge "Face-Off" episode (S04E317). The two have also won the "Best Couple" award at the 2011 MBC Entertainment Awards, making them the first male-male couple to have ever won the title.

"Alcohol CEO" is also his nickname on this programme, a nickname he gained since he operates a Karaoke-pub in Gangnam-gu, Seoul called "Mong" (몽, 夢, means "Dream" in Korean). This, combined with the previously mentioned nickname Daegari, led to Yoo Jae-suk nicknaming him "Chivas Daegal" (a reference to Chivas Regal).

In March 2016, he participated in Show Me the Money 5 - "open hiphop audition TV program". Even though he is not a rapper (but rather a comedian), he participated in the program.

Personal life
As of September 2010, he operates a Japanese restaurant at Gangnam, which is located near his home. After four years of dating, he married his girlfriend, a Korean-Japanese flight attendant, who is ten years his junior and nicknamed by Jun-ha himself and fellow Infinite Challenge members as "Nemo" on May 20, 2012. He also had some leg problems when he runs. The couple welcomed their first child, Ryouha, on March 22, 2013.

In 2021's episode of Learn Way (season 2), he was the teacher that taught Mijoo to make Makgeolli, as he is also a certified traditional Korean alcoholic drinks sommelier.

Television appearances

Music video
 PSY Gentleman (젠틀맨) (2013)

Recent programmes 

 Y-Star's God of Eating's Road (식신로드) (since 2010)
  Channel IHQ  A Leader's Day   (2021)
 Youtube HahaPD	Bottom Duo (2021) 	
 MBC's Hangout with Yoo (놀면 뭐하니) (since 2021)

Former programmes 
 SBS's Banjun Drama (대결! 반전드라마) (2004)
 MBC's High Kick! (거침없이 하이킥)
 MBC Drama's God of Eating Expedition (식신원정대) (2008-2010)
 MBC's Sunday Night - Gender Communication: Project Exploration of Genders (남녀소통 프로젝트 남심여심) (2012)
 MBC's Sunday Night - Magic Concert (매직콘서트 이것이 마술이다) (2012-2013)
MBC's Infinite Challenge (무한도전) (2006-2018)
Mnet's Show Me the Money 5 (쇼미더머니 5)
JTBC's Meat Party Talk (육자회담) (2020)

Radio shows

Television series

Web series

Movie
 DC League of Super-Pets, 2022 Lead role; Korean dub voice-over as Krypto / Bark Kent / Superdog 
Wreck-It Ralph, 2012 (Wreck-It Ralph, Korean version)
Marrying the Mafia IV, 2011 (Jong-myeon)
Honor of Family, 2011 (Jong Mun)
Marrying the Mafia III, 2006 (Jong-myeon)
 The Legend of Seven Cutter, 2006 (Koh Min Shik)
Marrying the Mafia II, 2005 (Jong-myeon) 
 Everybody has little secret, 2004 (Heo Ji Neun)

Awards

See also
 Infinite Challenge
 Munhwa Broadcasting Corporation

References

External links 
 'Muhan Dojeon' official Homepage
  

Infinite Challenge members
South Korean male musical theatre actors
South Korean male television actors
South Korean television presenters
South Korean comedians
Seoul National University alumni
1971 births
Living people